Epimastidia is a genus of butterflies in the family Lycaenidae first described by Hamilton Herbert Druce in 1891. The species of this genus are found in the Australasian realm. They are
Epimastidia arienis H. H. Druce, 1891.
Epimastidia inops  (C. Felder & R. Felder, 1860).
Epimastidia suffuscus Tennent, Müller & Peggie, 2014.
Epimastidia yiwikana Schröder, S., 2010.

References

External links

Polyommatini
Lycaenidae genera